The Speaker of the Saeima (lit. "Chairperson of the Saeima") is the presiding officer of the Parliament of Latvia, the Saeima.

If the President of Latvia resigns from office, dies or is removed from office before their term has ended, the Speaker of the Saeima shall assume the duties of the President until the Saeima has elected a new President. Similarly, the Speaker of the Saeima shall assume the duties of the President if the latter is away from Latvia or for any other reason unable to fulfil the duties of office.

The Speaker of the Saeima must be elected at the first meeting of the current convocation of the Saeima.

List of speakers

Speakers of the Saeima (1922–1934) 
Parties

Chairman of the Supreme Council (1990–1993)
Parties

Speakers of the Saeima (after 1993)
Parties

Timeline

See also
List of Chairmen of the Supreme Soviet of the Latvian Soviet Socialist Republic

References

Saeima
 
1922 establishments in Latvia